Tedd may refer to:

 Tedd (given name)
 Tedd, County Fermanagh, a townland in County Fermanagh, Northern Ireland